Carlsbad may refer to:

Carlsbad, California, United States
Carlsbad, New Mexico, United States
Carlsbad, Texas, United States
Karlovy Vary, Czech Republic; alternatively known as Carlsbad

See also